The 2020-2023 Horn of Africa drought is an ongoing drought that hit the countries of Somalia, Ethiopia, and Kenya. The rainy season of 2022 was recorded to be the driest in 70 years. With an estimated 43,000 dying in 2022.

, the region is now in its 5th failed rainy season and a 6th failed season is predicted.

Background

The drought is preceded by the 2011 East Africa drought and the 2017 Somali drought, and is caused by the El Niño effect.

Humanitarian situation

As of November 29, 2022, 36.4 million are reported to be affected in total, 24.1 million in Ethiopia, 7.8 million in Somalia and 4.5 million in Kenya. This includes 9 million women of reproductive age (15 to 49 years) who face dangers to their health and aggravated risks of gender-based violence due to the drought. 18 million are facing extreme hunger, 1.5 million are displaced, and 9.5 million livestock are reported dead, 4 million in Ethiopia, 2.5 million in Kenya and over 3 million in Somalia. Resulting in $1.5 billion being lost in livestock alone. 5.1 million children are acutely malnourished in drought-affected areas, of whom nearly 2.7 million are in Ethiopia, 640,000 in Kenya and 1.8 million in Somalia.

In Somalia, 7.8 million people face extreme hunger, a number that is expected to rise to 8 million by mid-2023, or half of the nations population. The droughts effects are further exacerbated by the Russo-Ukrainian War, as Somalia exported 90% of its wheat from the region, with its own farming capabilities destroyed in the 3 decade long Somali Civil War.

Livestock and wildlife

Pastoralists have reported much of their livestock perishing in the drought. In 2021, half of the lifestock of men in the town of Kargi, Kenya was reported to have died.

Furthermore, the deaths of

205 elephants
512 wildebeests
381 common zebras
51 buffalos
49 Grévy's zebras
12 giraffes

were reported between September 2021 to 2022 May by the Kenyan Wildlife Service in the Amboseli, Tsavo and Laikipia-Samburu areas.

See also

2011 East Africa drought
2017 Somali drought
2021 Somali drought

References 

Climate change and the environment
Droughts in Africa
Horn of Africa Drought
Horn of Africa Drought
Horn of Africa Drought